Sücka is a village of Liechtenstein, located in the municipality of Triesenberg.

Geography
The village is located just to the west of Rotenboden on the road to Steg and Malbun. The river Samina flows close to it.

References

Villages of Liechtenstein